Primer Plano may refer to:

 Primer Plano (magazine) in Spain
 Primer Plano (television show) in Venezuela